Anti-Ahmadi activities grew stronger and General Zia's government also took part in it. Ordinance XX was passed, which practically criminalized the Ahmadiyya faith. As a result, Mirza Tahir Ahmad had to migrate to England.

Pakistan won the gold medal in the 1984 Los Angeles Olympic games in the men's hockey event, beating Germany 2-1 and becoming Olympic champions for the third time.

Incumbents

Federal government 
President: Muhammad Zia-ul-Haq
Chief Justice: Mohammad Haleem

Governors 
Governor of Balochistan: 
 until 12 March: Rahimuddin Khan 
 22 March-18 November: F. S. Lodhi
 starting 18 November: Ghulam Ali khetran
Governor of Khyber Pakhtunkhwa: Fazle Haq 
Governor of Punjab: Ghulam Jilani Khan 
Governor of Sindh: S.M. Abbasi (until 6 April); Jahan Dad Khan (starting 6 April)

See also
1983 in Pakistan
Other events of 1984
1985 in Pakistan
List of Pakistani films of 1984
Timeline of Pakistani history

References 

 
1984 in Asia